Astemir Mukhamedovich Sheriyev (born February 23, 1990) is a former Russian footballer.

Career
Sheriyev made his professional debut for Spartak Nalchik on August 6, 2008 in the Russian Cup game against Vityaz.

In the summer of 2009, he moved to Rostov, where on September 19, 2009 he played his first Russian Premier League game against Kuban. In March 2010 FC Rostov loaned the defender to FC Nizhny Novgorod for one season.

External links

Russian footballers
PFC Spartak Nalchik players
FC Rostov players
1990 births
Living people
Russian Premier League players
FC Nizhny Novgorod (2007) players
Association football midfielders
Association football defenders